XL Airways may refer to:
 XL Airways France, which closed in 2019, formerly Star Airlines
 XL Airways Germany, which closed in 2013
 XL Airways UK, which closed in 2008 following XL Leisure Group's insolvency